Adolph Robert Kraus (August 5, 1850 - November 6, 1901), known professionally as Robert Kraus, was an American sculptor, born in Zeulenroda, Germany and active in Boston.

Biography 
Adolph Robert Kraus was born in Zeulenroda on August 5, 1850. He immigrated to the United States in 1881, and is best known for his sculpture of the Boston Massacre Monument in Boston Common, the winged Victory figures that crowned the towers of Machinery Hall in the Columbian Exposition of 1893, and the Randidge monument in Forest Hills Cemetery. He won the Grand Prize of Rome and was a pensioner of the Prussian government before moving to the United States.

He was hospitalized in Danvers, Massachusetts after showing signs of mental illness while attempting to create a sculpture of Belshazzar at the moment of seeing the handwriting on the wall. He died there on November 6, 1901.

Gallery

References 

 Appletons' annual cyclopaedia and register of important events, D. Appleton and company, 1902, page 441.
 American architect and architecture, The American Architect, volumes 71-74, 1901, page 50. 
 Anthony Mitchell Sammarco, Forest Hills Cemetery, Arcadia Publishing, 2009, page 80. .

American sculptors
1850 births
1901 deaths
German emigrants to the United States